The Supervisor of the Sea, by Emil Draitser, is a collection of short stories.

Plot introduction 
The longer and more serious stories of an acclaimed author that move from Russia to America to the fantastic beyond. Includes the celebrated "Wedding in Brighton Beach" and "Faithful Masha."

Reviews

Editions 
Grand Terrace, CA: Xenos Books.   (paper), 149 p.

2003 short story collections
Russian short story collections